Whittington is an English surname. Notable people with the surname include:

 Amanda Whittington (born 1968), English playwright
 Andrew Whittington (tennis) (born 1993), Australian tennis player
 Arthur Whittington (born 1955), American football player
 Bernard Whittington (born 1971), American football player
 Bert Whittington (1885–1969), Australian rules footballer
 Bill Whittington (1949–2021), American motor racing driver
 Buddy Whittington (born 1956), American guitarist
 C. L. Whittington (born 1952), American football player
 Clark Whittington, American artist
 Dale Whittington (1959–2003), American motor racing driver
 Don Whittington (born 1946), American motor racing driver
 Erik Whittington, American guitarist
 Eydie Whittington, American politician
 Greg Whittington (born 1993), American basketball player
 Harry Whittington (disambiguation), multiple people
 Hulon B. Whittington (1921–1969), American soldier
 Jeff Whittington (1985–1999), New Zealand murder victim
 Jim Whittington (born 1941), American televangelist
 John Whittington, American screenwriter
 Jonathan Whittington (born 1973), British singer-songwriter
 Khadijah Whittington (born 1986), American basketball player
 Lauren Whittington, American journalist
 Richard Whittington (disambiguation), multiple people
 Robert Whittington, 16th-century English grammarian
 Shayne Whittington (born 1991), American basketball player
 Stephen Whittington (born 1953), Australian composer, pianist, writer
 Sweet Dick Whittington (born 1934), American disc jockey
 William Madison Whittington (1878–1962), American politician

See also
Whitington, surname

English-language surnames